The Montauk Avenue station was a station on the demolished BMT Fulton Street Line in Brooklyn, New York City. It had 2 tracks and 2 side platforms. It was served by trains of the BMT Fulton Street Line. The station was opened on March 21, 1892, and was the eastern terminus of the Fulton Street Line until 1894, when the line was extended to Grant Avenue. On November 28, 1948, the Independent Subway System opened the underground Shepherd Avenue Subway station three blocks west after years of war-time construction delays. This station rendered both Montauk Avenue station and the nearby Linwood Street station obsolete, and it closed on April 26, 1956.

References

External links
Montauk Avenue Elevated Station; BMT Fulton Street Line (NYCSubway.org)

Railway stations in the United States opened in 1892
Railway stations closed in 1956
Defunct BMT Fulton Street Line stations
Former elevated and subway stations in Brooklyn